Singapore hosted the 2015 Southeast Asian Games from 5 to 16 June 2015.

Competitors
A total of 749 athletes competed in all 36 sports during the games.

Medal summary

Medal by sport

Medal by date

Multiple medalists 
Multiple medalists with more than one gold medal:

References

External links

Nations at the 2015 Southeast Asian Games
2015
Southeast Asian Games